Paziella petuchi is a species of sea snail, a marine gastropod mollusk in the family Muricidae, the murex snails or rock snails.

Description
The size of an adult shell attains 27 mm.

Distribution
This species is distributed in the Caribbean Sea along Venezuela.

References

 Merle D., Garrigues B. & Pointier J.-P. (2011) Fossil and Recent Muricidae of the world. Part Muricinae. Hackenheim: Conchbooks. 648 pp. page(s): 164

External links
 

Muricidae
Gastropods described in 1992